Demokrazia Hiru Milioi (Spanish: Democracia Tres Millones; D3M; also called Demokrazia 3,000,000) was an electoral platform which was formed to participate in the Basque Parliament elections in 2009.  It was declared illegal on February 8, 2009, as the Supreme Court of Spain considered that it was linked with the separatist organization ETA.

References

2009 disestablishments in Spain
2009 establishments in Spain
Banned secessionist parties
Banned socialist parties
Basque nationalism
Defunct socialist parties in the Basque Country (autonomous community)
Ecosocialist parties
Feminist parties in Europe
Green political parties in Spain
Left-wing nationalist parties
Political parties disestablished in 2009
Political parties established in 2009
Socialist feminist organizations
Banned political parties in the Basque Country (autonomous community)